Vallagarina (German: Lagertal) is one of the sixteen districts of Trentino in the Italian region of Trentino-Alto Adige/Südtirol. Its administrative seat and major town is Rovereto.

Overview 

The territory was named after the valley of Lagarina. As with Trentino's other "valley communities", it was created by provincial law in 2006.

Subdivisions 

Vallagarina is composed of the following 17 municipalities:

Ala
Avio
Besenello
Brentonico
Calliano
Isera
Mori
Nogaredo
Nomi
Pomarolo
Ronzo-Chienis
Rovereto (district capital)
Terragnolo
Trambileno
Vallarsa
Villa Lagarina
Volano

References

External links 
 Vallagarina official website

Districts of Trentino
States and territories established in 2006